Midland is a ghost town in Riverside County in the southeastern part of the U.S. state of California. It is accessible from Blythe in the south via Lovekin Boulevard and Midland Road, and from Rice in the north via Midland Road.

From 1925 to the 1960s, Midland was a company town owned by the U.S. Gypsum Co. The company had mined vast amounts of gypsum found in the area. Midland was also the site of a large plant that produced wallboard and plasterboard. For some time, there was a three part railroad between the quarry and the crusher, the last part being a  narrow gauge line running few miles. The town's water was shipped from Blythe by rail. At its peak, the town had a population of approximately 1,000.

As the character of the gypsum found in the area was considered too heavy as the years went on, company activity in Midland subsided and then ended in 1966.

Many winter scenes in Hollywood films during the 20th century utilized faux snow that originated from Midland.

Most of the buildings of Midland were torn down, and today only foundations remain. In 1970, a 150,000 gallon water tank from Midland was moved on skids by tractor to the new Mesa Ranch Mobile Home Park and a housing site in northwest Blythe.

References
 
 
 Midland – in Desert Fever, 1981

Further reading
 The Blythe California Chapter of Gold Prospectors Association of America page about Midland (with pictures)

Communities in Riverside County, California
Ghost towns in California
Company towns in California
Populated places established in 1925
Mining in Riverside County, California